Mikalojus Tiškevičius (1721 – 6 December 1796 in Vilnius) was a boyar, nobleman, Graf of the Leliwa coat of arms, canon, state and military figure of the Grand Duchy of Lithuania and the Polish–Lithuanian Commonwealth. He owned the Liubavas Manor in Liubavas, in the northern part of Vilnius.

References 

1721 births
1796 deaths
18th-century Lithuanian people
Tyszkiewicz family